James Warren (18061908) was a British engineer who, around 1848 to 1907 (along with Willoughby Monzoni), patented the Warren-style truss bridge and girder design. This bridge design is mainly constructed by equilateral triangles which can carry both tension and compression. The first suspension bridge to utilize a Warren truss in its design was the Manhattan Bridge in New York City.

The Warren Truss design was also used in early aviation when biplanes were dominant, the alternating diagonal truss being used for the interplane struts in aircraft such as the Handley Page H.P.42 airliner and the Fiat CR.42 fighter. The Warren truss is one of the most widely used and known bridge styles worldwide.

References

1806 births
1908 deaths
British bridge engineers
British centenarians
Men centenarians
Date of birth missing
Date of death missing